The Connecticut Antique Machinery Association is a museum that preserves historic machinery, located in Kent, Connecticut. The museum has a number of exhibits on industrial technology such as internal combustion engines, steam engines, agriculture, and logging. Included within the museum grounds is a 3 ft narrow gauge railroad, with an operating steam locomotive originally from Hawaii.

History 
The museum originated from a local group of hobbyists, and first formed in 1984. It opened to the public in September 1985 on a 14-acre site in Kent, Connecticut.

References 

Museums in Litchfield County, Connecticut
Railroad museums in Connecticut
1984 establishments in Connecticut